Big Blue Bubble, Inc. is a Canadian video game company headquartered in London, Ontario founded in 2004 by industry veteran Damir Slogar, Renata Slogar, and Claudette Critchley. The company has developed over one hundred games and gained international recognition with their game My Singing Monsters which has been downloaded over 100 million times. Swedish company Enad Global 7 acquired Big Blue Bubble on August 27, 2020.

History

Early Years (2004 - 2009) 
Founded in 2004 by industry veteran Damir Slogar, along with co-founders Renata Slogar, Claudette Critchley. In the early days of its history, Big Blue Bubble made a name for itself by specializing in casual and mobile games. Its first game, Bubble Trouble, was used in marketing campaigns by Nokia and it was followed by space thriller Captain Lunar, which was used as a launch title for the Sony Ericsson T610. Soon after, Big Blue Bubble began adapting film and television franchises, such as 24 for handheld devices. In the mid to late 2000s, the company started moving towards console development, to include the Wii and PlayStation 2 platforms.

Return to Mobile (2010 - 2012) 
In the early 2010s, Big Blue Bubble returned to its roots in mobile gaming and the 'freemium' business model. This return to mobile resulted in a shifting focus on original intellectual properties such as Burn the Rope, Thumpies, and most notably My Singing Monsters.

Post-My Singing Monsters (2012 - Present) 
Released on September 4, 2012, for Apple iOS, My Singing Monsters was both a critical and commercial success soon after its release, with Kotaku describing the game as a "clever combination of music and monster breeding", praising how the complexity of a song can become developed by the utility of breeding Monsters, each monster revealing a new line to the song.  Through continued support, the game has grown into a multimedia franchise, with a prequel, several spin-off games, books, live events and series, and a board game.

After years in the mobile game space, Big Blue Bubble made the decision to return to console games with the development of the action-platformer, Foregone, a retro-pixel side-scrolling adventure that released on the Epic Games Store February 27, 2020 and Nintendo Switch, Xbox One, and PlayStation 4 on October 13, 2020. On May 12, 2021, Big Blue Bubble announced that the My Singing Monsters series would be releasing its first console title called My Singing Monsters: Playground. The game subsequently released on November 9, 2021.

On August 26, 2020, Swedish company Enad Global 7 acquired Big Blue Bubble for $16M CAD, alongside a debt-free payment of $60M CAD.

Recently announced for Steam, Big Blue Bubble is currently developing a music-based roguelike deck-building game, Power Chord.

References

External links
Big Blue Bubble company website
Big Blue Bubble at GameSpot
Big Blue Bubble at IGN

Canadian companies established in 2004
Companies based in London, Ontario
Video game development companies
Video game companies of Canada
Video game companies established in 2004
2020 mergers and acquisitions
Canadian subsidiaries of foreign companies